Anceya giraudi is a species of tropical freshwater snail with a gill and an operculum, an aquatic gastropod mollusk in the family Paludomidae.

This species is found in Burundi, the Democratic Republic of the Congo, Tanzania, and Zambia. Its natural habitat is freshwater lakes.

Anceya giraudi has been considered as Endangered species in 1996.

References

Paludomidae
Gastropods described in 1885
Taxonomy articles created by Polbot